An apostolic prefect or prefect apostolic is a priest who heads what is known as an apostolic prefecture, a 'pre-diocesan' missionary jurisdiction where the Catholic Church is not yet sufficiently developed to have it made a diocese. Although it usually has an (embryonal) see, it is often not called after such city but rather after a natural or administrative (in many cases colonial) geographical area.

If a prefecture grows and flourishes, it may be elevated to an apostolic vicariate, headed by a titular bishop, in the hope that with time the region will generate enough Catholics and stability for its Catholic institutions, to warrant being established as a diocese. Both these stages remain missionary, hence exempt, i.e. directly subject to the Holy See (notably the Roman Congregation for the Evangelization of Peoples), normally not part of an ecclesiastical province.

The full sequence of development is: independent mission, apostolic prefecture, apostolic vicariate, apostolic diocese; however steps may be skipped at the papal discretion, so the next steps may be bishopric or even archbishopric.

The apostolic prefecture and the apostolic vicariate are to be distinguished from the territorial abbacy (formerly called an "abbey nullius").

History 
During the last centuries of the second millennium it was the practice of the Holy See to govern either through prefects apostolic or apostolic vicariates, many territories where no dioceses with resident bishops were erected and where local circumstances, such as the character and customs of the people or hostility of civil powers, made it doubtful whether an episcopal see could be permanently established. The establishing of a prefecture apostolic in a place supposes that the Church has attained only a small development in the area. Fuller growth leads to the foundation of an apostolic vicariate as an intermediate stage to becoming a diocese.

"An apostolic vicariate or apostolic prefecture is a certain portion of the people of God which has not yet been established as a diocese due to special circumstances and which, to be shepherded, is entrusted to an apostolic vicar or apostolic prefect who governs it in the name of the Supreme Pontiff." Can. 371 §1.

A prefect apostolic is of lower rank than a vicar apostolic. The prefect's powers are more limited and do not normally possess the episcopal character, as is ordinarily the case with a vicar apostolic. The duties of a prefect apostolic consist in directing the work of the mission entrusted to his care; his powers are in general those necessarily connected with the ordinary administration of such an office, for instance: the assigning of missionaries and the making of regulations for the good management of the affairs of the mission.  

Prefects apostolic govern independent territories and are subject only to the pope. When a vicariate or a diocese extended over a very large territory in which the Catholic population was unequally distributed, the Holy See sometimes placed a portion of the territory in charge of a prefect apostolic; in which case the faculties of the prefect were more limited, and in the exercise of his office he was supervised by the vicar apostolic or the diocesan bishop. With a view to better protecting the authority of the local vicar apostolic or bishop, it was proposed in the First Vatican Council to abolish prefects apostolic having jurisdiction over districts within a vicariate or diocese of the Latin Church, but the Council was interrupted and the practice continued until Pope Leo XIII abolished them within the Oriental Churches by a decree of Propaganda Fide on 12 September 1896, and established superiors with special dependence on the papal representatives of the areas concerned.

In 1911 there were 66 prefectures apostolic: 5 in Europe; 17 in Asia; 3 in North America (e.g., the Yukon); 11 in South America; 23 in Africa and 7 in Oceania.

At the end of 2010, the prefectures apostolic were only 39, of which the vast majority (29) were in PR China (many vacant), where development of the Catholic Church, including that of the prefectures, had long been hindered by actions of the government. The 10 other prefectures included a newly created one for Azerbaijan, 4 more in Asia, 3 in Africa, 1 in the Americas and 1 in Oceania.

Current apostolic prefectures

In China 

 Ankang 安康 (Hinganfu) / Ankang
 Baojing 保靖 / Paoking
 Guilin 桂林 / Kweilin
 Hainan 海南 / Hainan
 Haizhou 海州 / Haichow
 Jiamusi 佳木斯 / Kiamusze
 Jian′ou 建甌 / Kienow
 Lingling 零岭 / Yongzhou 永州 / Yungchow
 Linqing 臨清 / Lintsing
 Lintong 臨潼 / Lintung
 Lixian 澧縣 / Lizhou 澧州 / Lichow
 Qiqihar 齊齊哈爾 / Tsitsibar
 Shaowu 邵武 /
 Shashi 沙市 / Shasi
 Shiqian 石阡 / Shihtsien
 Suixian 隨縣 / Suihsien
 Tongzhou 同州 / Tungchow
 Tunxi 屯溪 / Tunki
 Weihai(wei) 威海衛 / Weihaiwei
 Xiangtan 湘潭 / Siangtan
 Xining 西寧 / Sining
 Xinjiang 新絳 / Jiangzhou 絳州 / Kiangchow
 Xinjiang-Urumqi 新疆-烏魯木齊  / Sinkiang
 Xinxiang 新鄉 / Sinsiang
 Yangzhou 揚州 / Yangchow
 Yiduxian 益都縣 / Iduhsien
 Yixian 易縣 / Yihsien
 Yueyang 岳陽 / Yuezhou 岳州 / Yochow
 Zhaotong 昭通 / Chaotung

Elsewhere in Eurasia 
 Battambang in Cambodia
 Kampong Cham in Cambodia
 Ulaanbaatar in Mongolia
 Yuzhno Sakhalinsk in Asian Russia and Japan
 Baku, in and covering Azerbaijan (raised to the level of prefecture on 4 August 2011; had been Mission sui iuris of Baku from 11 October 2006)

Americas 
 Falkland Islands (U.K.)

Oceania 
 Marshall Islands, not exempt but in the ecclesiastical province of Agana.

Africa
 Misurata, in Libya
 Robe, in Ethiopia
 Western Sahara

Former apostolic prefectures 
''(very incomplete)
Most former apostolic prefectures were promoted to apostolic vicariate or territorial prelature (under a titular bishop) or (mostly later) to a diocese or even an archdiocese (under a residential bishop), but some ceased to exist (at least under their name or extent) being suppressed or sometimes dismembered.

Europe 
 Iceland (promoted Diocese of Reykjavík)
 Rhodes and adjacent islands (insular Greece)
 Apostolic Prefecture of Scotland (UK)
Luxembourg (promoted Apostolic Vicariate, now Archdiocese )

Germany 
 Lausitz (Lusatia)
 Schleswig-Holstein

Asia

Indian subcontinent 
 French Colonies in India (then French India)
 Jubbulpore
 Madura (Diocese of Tiruchirapalli)

Malay Archipelago 
 Bangka and Biliton (now Diocese of Pangkal-Pinang)
 Brunei (now Apostolic Vicariate of Brunei)
 Labuan e Borneo, then Northern Borneo {Borneo Settentrionale} (now Archdiocese of Kota Kinabalu)
 Sarawak (now Archdiocese of Kuching)
 Mindanào
 Mindoro (now Apostolic Vicariate of Calapan)
 Mountain Province (now Diocese of Baguio)
 Palawan (now Apostolic Vicariate of Puerto Princesa)
 Sulu (now Apostolic Vicariate of Jolo)

Americas

North and central America 
 Îles de la Terre Ferme (now Fort-de-France–Saint-Pierre|)
 United States

South America 
 Alto Solimões (promoted diocese)
 Apostolic Prefecture of Araucanía
 Tefé (now Territorial Prelature)
 Tumaco

Oceania 
 German Solomon Islands
 Northern Solomon Islands
 South Seas Islands

Africa and Indian Ocean

North Africa 
 Bahr el-Ghazal - part of the Diocese of Wau
 Delta of the Nile (Egypt)
 Equatorial Nile
 Sahara and Sudan

Horn of Africa 
 Eritrea

Indian Ocean islands 
 Islands of the Indian Ocean, then Bourbon (now Diocese of Saint-Denis de La Réunion)

West Africa 
 Bobo-Dioulasso (promoted Archdiocese, in Burkina Faso)
 Katanga (then Belgian Congo)
 Apostolic Prefecture of Kayes (now Diocese in Mali)
 Mupoi (Diocese of Tombura-Yambio)
 N’Zérékoré
 Oubangui Chari (French colonial name of Central African Republic; now Metropolitan of Bangui)

See also 

 List of Catholic dioceses (alphabetical)
 List of Catholic dioceses (structured view)
 List of Roman Catholic archdioceses
 List of Catholic military ordinariates/(arch)dioceses
 List of Catholic apostolic administrations (permanent or ad hoc)
 List of Catholic apostolic vicariates
 List of Eastern Catholic exarchates
 List of Catholic territorial prelatures
 List of Catholic missions sui juris

References

Sources and external links 
 GCatholic.org - List of Current Apostolic Prefectures; and many other pages

 
 
Catholic ecclesiastical titles